Nigel Debenham is a former association football player who represented New Zealand at international level.

Debenham made his full All Whites debut in a 2–0 win over Singapore on 1 October 1978. It was 10 years before he next played an official game for his national side when came on as a substitute for two games against Taiwan in 1988, before a fourth and final appearance in a 1–4 loss to Australia on 12 March 1989.

References 

Year of birth missing (living people)
Living people
New Zealand association footballers
New Zealand international footballers
Association football defenders